Belmond Miraflores Park is a 5-star luxury hotel in Lima, Peru. The hotel is located in Miraflores District, along a tree-lined avenue on the Av malecon de la reserva. An observatory lounge is located on the 11th floor, with scenic views of the city.  It is also a venue for conferences and wedding receptions. It was formerly known as the Orient-Express Hotel. In March 2014 Orient-Express Hotels was renamed Belmond, at which point the location changed its name to Belmond Miraflores Park.

References

External links
 Official website

Hotels in Lima
Belmond hotels
Hotels established in 1977
Hotel buildings completed in 1977